Lublin Główny railway station (Polish Stacja Lublin Główny) is the most important railway station in Lublin, Poland.  It was officially renamed to Lublin Główny (Lublin Main) in December, 2019  to distinguish it from other, much smaller stations located in Lublin.

The station serves trains running on the four lines radiating from Lublin: north-east to Warsaw, north to Łuków, east to Chełm and the border with Ukraine, and south to Przeworsk.  It is one of the busiest stations in eastern Poland, with over 50 train departures on a typical day.

History 

The station building was opened in 1877, together with the Vistula River Railroad, which connected Warsaw with Kovel.  At the time Lublin was in the Russian Empire as part of Congress Poland.

Following the recreation of Poland in 1918, the station building was reconstructed in the 1920s to give it a more Polish style, as the original building looked like a typical station of the Russian Empire.  In recent years the station was completely refurbished.  Because of this, it is now considered one of the best railway stations in Poland, according to Gazeta Wyborcza which gave it second place in the ranking of 23 most significant Polish railway stations.

The station is linked by rail to the Lublin Airport.

Upgrades and modernization 
In 2011 a modernization of the line north of Lublin to Lubartów started.  The 25 km single track section had its maximum speed upgraded to 120 km/h, from previous 30–60 km/h.  Once finished, passenger services were restored on it starting from April 2, 2013.

In 2017 modernization of the line between Lublin and Warsaw (specifically the section between Lublin and Pilawa) began, with train traffic suspended during construction and trains between Warsaw and Lublin rerouted through Łuków.  The lined re-opened for partial service (using only one of the planned two tracks) in December, 2019. Once the upgrades were completed, the trip time between Lublin and Warsaw has been reduced to under 2 hours as of early 2023, with maximum train speed reaching 160 km/h.  The goal is to further reduce the travel times to 90 minutes once all the track upgrades are completed around 2027.

In 2018-2021 the train platforms of the station have been upgraded.

Currently, the Lublin intercity bus terminal is inconveniently located 3 km away from the main railway station, making train-bus transfers difficult.  However, there are plans to build a new bus terminal near the train station in the years 2021–2023. The bus terminal and Lublin Main Station will be part of Lublin Metropolitan Integrated Terminal. Construction works are at a very advanced stage.

Platforms 
Number of platforms as of August 15, 2022:

Platform 1 - the longest platform adjancent to the station building. It is used for sending long-distance trains towards Radom, Warsaw (and beyond e.g. to Wrocław, Gdynia) and Kiev (via Dorohusk).

Platform 1a - It used for sending short long-distance trains in the same directions as platform 1 and local trains to Dęblin. It is ended with a buffer stop.

Platform 1b - It used for sending local trains to Zamość, Chełm, and Lublin Airport. Like platform 1a it is ended with a buffer stop.

Platform 2 - It have two edges. It used for sending long-distance and local trains towards Stalowa Wola Rozwadów, Rzeszów Główny (and beyond to Kraków Główny, Wrocław Główny), and toward Chełm, Lublin Airport.

Platform 3 - It have two edges. It mainly used for sending local trains toward Chełm, Włodawa and Zamość.

Types of trains and carriers 

At Lublin Główny station stops local, express and fast trains (semi-express; train with more stops than express, but fewer than local trains). Local trains are managed by Polregio under the REGIO (R) brand, while express and fast trains are managed by PKP Intercity under the InterCity (IC) and Twoje Linie Kolejowe (TLK) brands.

The station is served by the following service(s):

 Intercity services (IC) Łódź Fabryczna — Warszawa — Lublin Główny
 Intercity services (IC) Kołobrzeg - Piła - Bydgoszcz - Warszawa - Lublin - Hrubieszów 
Intercity services (TLK) Lublin Główny — Świnoujście''

References

External links
 

Railway stations in Poland opened in 1877
Railway stations in Lublin Voivodeship
Buildings and structures in Lublin
Railway stations served by Przewozy Regionalne InterRegio
1877 establishments in the Russian Empire